Grant Lake may refer to:

 Grant Lake (Mono County, California)
 Grant Lake (Santa Clara County, California)
 Grant Lake (Douglas County, Minnesota)

See also
 Grant (disambiguation)
 Grand Lake (disambiguation)